Voulgari is an under-construction metro station serving Thessaloniki Metro's Line 1. The station is named after Dimitrios Voulgaris, eight-time Prime Minister of Greece between 1855 and 1875. It is expected to enter service in 2023.

This station also appears in the 1988 Thessaloniki Metro proposal.

References

See also
List of Thessaloniki Metro stations

Thessaloniki Metro